397th may refer to:

397th Bombardment Squadron, inactive United States Air Force unit
397th Bombardment Wing, inactive United States Air Force unit, last assigned to the 45th Air Division of Strategic Air Command
397th Engineer Battalion (United States), construction battalion of the United States Army based in Eau Claire, Wisconsin
397th Fighter Squadron, inactive United States Air Force unit

See also
397 (number)
397, the year 397 (CCCXCVII) of the Julian calendar
397 BC